Stenoma holophaea is a moth of the family Depressariidae. It is found in French Guiana.

The wingspan is about 18 mm. The forewings are rather dark brown and the hindwings are dark grey.

References

Moths described in 1916
Taxa named by Edward Meyrick
Stenoma